Mail Dominance is an album by the American rapper Esham, released in 1999.

Critical reception
AllMusic wrote that "Unfortunately, on Mail Dominance it's not his delivery or flow that seems questionable but rather his lyrics and the production. When not rapping about nihilistic themes, Esham struggles to find engaging lyrics; here he's best when he raps indecipherably." The Village Voice thought that "it’s intermittently irritating or annoying—the production is mega-chintzy, and boy does he hate women (hook of 'Ozonelayer': 'You bitch/you bitch/you bitch you bitch you bitch you bitch you bitch')—but it doesn’t get anywhere near boring, or overfamiliar." The Windsor Star opined that the album "provides more musical variety than most radio stations, with rap, dance, rock and even corny '50s- sitcom-influenced tracks."

Track listing

Personnel
Esham - performer
Sue Gillis - background vocals
Mastamind - vocals
TNT - vocals
Laura Ruby - background vocals
Larry Santos - background vocals
Scott Santos - background vocals
Jade Scott - performer
Zelah Williams - background vocals

Production
Producers: Esham, Santos
Engineers: Esham, Santos
Mastering: Esham, Santos
Graphic design: Matthew Kozuch-Rea

References

Albums produced by Esham
Esham albums
1999 albums
Reel Life Productions albums
G-funk albums